The Relay of Youth (Serbo-Croatian and Slovenian: Štafeta mladosti (Cyrillic: Штафета младости), Macedonian: Штафета на младоста, Albanian: Stafeta e Rinise) was a symbolic relay race held in Socialist Federal Republic of Yugoslavia every year.  The relay carried a baton with a birthday pledge to Josip Broz Tito ostensibly from all young people of Yugoslavia.  The race usually started in Tito's birth town Kumrovec and went through all major towns and cities of the country. It ended in Belgrade at JNA Stadium on May 25, Tito's official birthday and Day of Youth, a national holiday.

The relay first took place in 1945 and was formalized as a national holiday in 1957. It went on after Tito's death in 1980 and was last held in 1988.

In 1987, the winning poster design for the relay caused a national scandal, as it was revealed to have been based on a Nazi propaganda poster. The authors, the design division of Neue Slowenische Kunst, submitted the design in order to protest Tito's cult of personality, of which the relay was a major part.  Along with the rising crisis of the Yugoslav state, this scandal is deemed to have significantly contributed to the decision to discontinue the Relay.

References

External links

Relay processions
Recurring sporting events established in 1945
Recurring events disestablished in 1988
Propaganda in Yugoslavia
Annual events in Yugoslavia
1945 establishments in Yugoslavia
1988 disestablishments in Yugoslavia
Youth in Yugoslavia
Youth events